The 1967–68 Scottish Inter-District Championship was a rugby union competition for Scotland's district teams.

This season saw the 15th Scottish Inter-District Championship.

Edinburgh District, South and Glasgow District shared the competition with 2 wins and a loss each.

1967-68 League Table

Results

Round 1

Glasgow District: 

South:

Round 2

 Edinburgh District: 

North and Midlands:

Round 3

Glasgow District:

Edinburgh District:

Round 4

North and Midlands: 

South:

Round 5

South: 

Edinburgh District:

Round 6

North and Midlands: 

Glasgow District:

References

1967–68 in Scottish rugby union
Scottish Inter-District Championship seasons